Chayan may refer to:


Places
 Chayan, Bahar, a village in Bahar County, Hamadan Province, Iran 
 Chayan, Razan, a village in Razan County, Hamadan Province, Iran

People
 Gerardo Alvarez-Vazquez, Mexican drug trafficker known as El Chayán
 Mamunur Rahman Chayan, Bangladeshi field hockey player

Other uses
 "Chayan" (चयन), an essay by Suryakant Tripathi (1897–1961)

See also
 Çayan (disambiguation)
 Cayan
 Chayanne